Laos, officially the Lao People's Democratic Republic, is divided into 17 provinces (Lao ແຂວງ,  or ) and one prefecture, the Vientiane capital city municipality (ນະຄອນຫຼວງ, nakhon louang, or Na Kone Luang Vientiane). The special administrative zone (ເຂດພິເສດ, khet phiset), Xaisomboun, created in 1994, was dissolved on 13 January 2006. In 2013, parts of the former special administrative zone was reestablished as Xaisomboun province.

Provinces and prefectures of Laos

Population 
The population of each province in 2023 is given in the census data. The population of Laos in 2023 is 6,730,000.

History 
In 1989 Vientiane prefecture was split from Vientiane province and the capital of Vientiane province moved from Vientiane to Muang Phôn-Hông. In 1994 Xaisômboun khetphiset (special region) was formed from parts of the Bolikhamxai, Vientiane, and Xiangkhoang provinces. In 2006 Xaisomboun special region was dissolved and the Longsan, Xaysomboun, Phun, and Hom districts added to Vientiane province, while Thathon district was transferred to Xiengkhuang province.

Further divisions 
The provinces are then subdivided into districts (muang) and villages (baan).

Geography 
The provinces are grouped geographically into 3 strata, North (from Phongsaly to Saiyabouly, Luang Prabang and Xiengkhuang), Central (Vientiane and Bolikhamxay) and South (from Khammuane to Champasack).

See also
List of provinces of Laos by Human Development Index
ISO 3166-2:LA

References

External links
 CityMayors.com article

 
Subdivisions of Laos
Laos, provinces
Laos 1
Provinces, Laos
Laos geography-related lists